Lake Hendricks is a lake in the U.S. states of Minnesota and South Dakota.

Lake Hendricks was named in about 1857 for Thomas A. Hendricks, a politician.

References

Lakes of Minnesota
Lakes of South Dakota
Lakes of Lincoln County, Minnesota
Lakes of Brookings County, South Dakota